David Norman Hewett (born 14 July 1971) is a New Zealand rugby union coach and former player. During his playing career, he played as a prop for Canterbury, the Crusaders, the Scarlets and Edinburgh.

Rugby union career

Player
He played for the Crusaders in Super Rugby and for Canterbury in the Air New Zealand Cup. He made his debut for the All Blacks at the age of 30 in November 2001 against Ireland and won 22 full caps for the national team scoring two tries. Hewett signed a short-term deal with the Welsh regional team the Llanelli Scarlets in November 2004, playing three times before returning to New Zealand at the end of January. He was expected to return to the Scarlets for the 2005–06 season, having agreed a two-year contract, but he ended up signing a similar deal with Edinburgh in March 2005. He played for the Scottish team until 2007, his last year as professional.

Coach
From 2007 to 2016, Hewett worked in coaching roles for the Canterbury Crusaders. He has also coached for NZ Secondary Schools, NZ U20 and USA Eagles. He was appointed as coach for the Southland Stags for 2018 and 2019.

References

External links

1971 births
Living people
New Zealand international rugby union players
People educated at Christchurch Boys' High School
New Zealand rugby union players
University College Dublin R.F.C. players
Canterbury rugby union players
Crusaders (rugby union) players
Scarlets players
Edinburgh Rugby players
Rugby union players from Christchurch
Rugby union props
Expatriate rugby union players in Scotland
Expatriate rugby union players in Wales
New Zealand expatriate sportspeople in Wales
New Zealand expatriate sportspeople in Scotland
New Zealand expatriate rugby union players